Supernature may refer to:

 Supernature (Cerrone III), a 1977 album by Cerrone
 "Supernature" (song), the title track, covered by Erasure

Supernature (Inkubus Sukkubus album), 2001
Supernature (Goldfrapp album), 2005
Supernature, a 1973 book by Lyall Watson
 "Supernature", a song by Sharon Needles from the album Taxidermy
 Ricky Gervais: SuperNature, a 2022 Netflix stand-up comedy show

See also
 Supernatural (disambiguation)